The Very Best of Jake Thackray is the name of two compilation albums by Jake Thackray, the first released on LP in 1975, and the second on CD in 2003. They were both released on EMI records and produced by Norman Newell. Although the two albums share the same title, their track lists greatly differ (with only five songs alike), and their covers each depict a different photograph of Thackray, albeit from the same photoshoot.

The 1975 album features songs from all of Thackray’s albums released prior to that year, whereas the 2003 album was released after Thackray’s death and includes songs from 1977’s On Again! On Again!, thereby providing a more complete retrospective of his career.

1975 album

Track listing

2003 album

Track listing

References

External links
LP track listing at jakethackray.com

Jake Thackray albums
1975 greatest hits albums
Albums produced by Norman Newell
EMI Records compilation albums